The Women's omnium at the 2014 UCI Track Cycling World Championships was held on 1–2 March 2014. 17 cyclists participated in the contest. The final standings were determined by adding ranks in the six events; the rider with the lowest cumulative score won the gold medal.

Medalists

Results

Flying lap
The flying lap was held at 12:40.

Points race
The points race was held at 15:00.

Elimination race
The elimination race was held at 22:03.

Individual pursuit
The individual pursuit was held at 12:20.

Scratch race
The scratch race was held at 15:40.

500m time trial
The 500m time trial was held at 16:25.

Final standings
After all events.

References

2014 UCI Track Cycling World Championships
UCI Track Cycling World Championships – Women's omnium